Kempele is a municipality  south of the city of Oulu and  south of the Oulu Airport in Northern Finland. Historically it was in the province of Oulu, but today it is in the region of Northern Ostrobothnia. The municipality of Kempele was founded in 1867.

Kempele is the birthplace of former NHL goaltender Pekka Rinne.

The neighbouring municipalities are Liminka, Oulu and Tyrnävä.

History
Kempele was first permanently settled about 500 years ago, at a time when the coastline was closer than it is today. Kempele was considered part of Greater Liminka and consisted of only three houses in 1568, when it was called Kempele for the first time in official records. In 1774 full church privileges were granted to Kempele, which meant separation from Liminka and establishment as an autonomous parish. The municipal government was established in 1867.

Sights

The old church of Kempele, which was built between 1688 and 1691, is one of the oldest wooden churches in Finland. Kempele was granted the right to build a prayer room in 1688, but parishioners decided to construct a church with a steeple. Given the custom of burying local notables under the church, there are about 150 graves in the crypt, the last of them dating from 1796. The church includes decorations by the noted Finnish painter Mikael Toppelius.

The old church ceased to be in active use after a new church was built next to it in the 1990s, but some events are still held in it from time to time.

Kempele may be best known for being the headquarters of the world-famous heart rate monitor corporation Polar Electro, which first brought the device to market in 1978.

International relations

Twin towns — Sister cities
  Elva, Estonia

See also
 Finnish regional road 816
 Oulunsalo
 Zeppelin (shopping centre)

References

External links
 
 Municipality of Kempele
 Map of Kempele

 
Populated places established in 1867